The Beaufort Street Festival was an annual community street festival in Perth, Western Australia that took place each November along Beaufort Street and other nearby streets. The event ran five times from 2010 to 2015. It ran through the suburbs of Highgate and Mount Lawley.

The event consisted of various music, family, food, fashion and art programs. In 2014, over 150,000 people attended the festival, making it one of Perth's largest street festivals at that time.

In 2016 the Beaufort Street Network community group who organised the event announced the festival would "take a break" given concerns around the growing numbers of people attending the event.

References

Festivals in Perth, Western Australia
Beaufort Street, Perth